Dada Bhagwan (7 November, 1908 – 2 January, 1988), also known as Dadashri, born Ambalal Muljibhai Patel, was a spiritual leader from Gujarat, India who founded the Akram Vignan Movement. He was religiously inclined from the early age. He worked as a contractor for a company maintaining dry docks in Bombay before attaining "self-realization" in 1958. He left business and focused on his spiritual goals. The movement around his teaching grew into the Akram Vignan movement gaining followers in western India and abroad.

Biography

Early life
Ambalal Muljibhai Patel (A. M. Patel) was born on 7 November 1908 in Tarsali, a village near Baroda (now in Gujarat, India). His parents, Muljibhai and Jhaverba, were Vaishnava Patidars. He grew up in Bhadran, Kheda district in central Gujarat. A. M. Patel credited his mother for instilling an early appreciation of the values of nonviolence, empathy, selfless generosity, and spiritual penance within him. It is said that he was blessed by a saint when he was thirteen who told that he would attain liberation. He married a local village girl named Hiraba in 1924. Their children (born in 1928 and 1931) died a few months after birth so they had no surviving children. During this period, he was also influenced by the writings of Shrimad Rajchandra a Jain Monk who was also the spiritual Guru of Mahatma Gandhi and householder and religious teacher whose teaching inspired new religious movement later. He began practising temporary celibacy and later vowed lifelong celibacy.  He was a contractor by profession. He moved to Bombay where he worked successfully as a contractor for the company Patel & Co. The company used to maintain and construct dry docks in the Bombay harbour.

Dada Bhagwan
He claimed to have attained self-realisation in June 1958 at Surat railway station while sitting on a bench at platform number 3. It was about 6 pm and it lasted 48 minutes. However this was not revealed initially by him.

After his experience, a close relative began to address him by the spiritual name of Dada (a Gujarati term for "Revered Grandfather") Bhagwan (Lord) became his spiritual name. The experience or self-realization is described as revelation or manifestation of the god within, or pure self, supreme self manifested through body; which he later called Dada Bhagwan. He had differentiated between self and his empirical self as Patel and Dada Bhagwan.

He left his business to his partners to concentrate on his spiritual goals. He continued to live on the dividends of his shares of company. He continued his householder life as his teaching did not require renunciation or asceticism.

Akram Vignan movement
Dada Bhagwan formed a movement which he termed Akram Vignan Movement. Unlike the step-by-step purification according to Jain principles,  Akram Vignan promises instant salvation through the grace of Simandhar Swami, for whom Dada Bhagwan serves as a medium. His followers believe that they will be reborn in two lives in Mahavideha, a mythical land described in Jain cosmology from where they can achieve Moksha (liberation) as they are in connection with Gnani (knower). Flügel regards the movement to be a form of Jain-Vaishnava syncretism, a development analogous to the Mahayana in Buddhism.

Initially, he had not revealed his experiences to the public but his some close relatives and friends knew it. In 1962, during a conversation with him, a person named Chandrakant Patel from Uganda experienced sudden self-realization. Such experience is described in traditional Jainism as kshayak samkit which is only achieved in presence of Tirthankara. Kanubhai K. Patel was the second person, who was also his business partner, who received instant knowledge in 1963 from Dada Bhagwan.

Expansion of movement
Between 1962 and 1968, very few close people received "knowledge" through Dada Bhagwan. Following 1968, he bestowed "knowledge" who requested to be blessed. This is the foundation of the movement. He said that he was initially reluctant due to fear of public opinion as in case of Shrimad Rajchandra but after his visit to a Rishabha temple in Khambhat he decided to public performance of Gnanvidhi, a practice to transfer of "knowledge" for self-realisation. In 1968, the first Gnanvidhi was held at Bombay. Over the years, the Gnanvidhi became more elaborate and achieved its present form in 1983. He continued to give spiritual discourses all over the world. He emphasized contact of "knower" (Gnani) to gain knowledge over scriptural or ritual knowledge. His followers were initially spread in his hometown Vadodara and Bombay. The movement expanded in the 1960s and 1970s to southern Gujarat and Maharashtra and in Gujarati diaspora in East Africa, North America and UK. In 1983, he had reportedly around 50,000 followers.

When he died on 2 January 1988, his funeral was attended by about 60000 followers.

Trimandir

Bhagwan also founded the Trimandir. The aim of Trimandir is to honor the Gods of Jainism, Shaivism, Vaishnavism and other religions with equal reverence. The Trimandirs are non-sectarian temples that are operated by the Shree Simandhar Swami Aradhana Trust.

Succession
Soon after the death of Dada Bhagwan, the movement split into two factions. One led by Kanubhai Patel and backed by Jay Sachchidannad Sangh and other led by Niruben Amin. Niruben claimed that she was instructed and trained in Gnanvidhi by Dada Bhagwan. Niruben formed her own organisations; Dada Bhagwan Foundation Trust and Simandhar Swami Aradhana Trust in Ahmedabad and Mahavideh Foundation in Mumbai. She became a popular leader of the movement and was addressed as Niruma by her followers from 1999. After death of Niruben in 2006, she was succeeded by Deepakbhai Desai.

Recognition
In 2012, the Ahmedabad Municipal Corporation named a stretch of road between Visat crossroads and Sabarmati crossroads as Pujya Dada Bhagwan Road and the Zundal circle as Dada Bhagwan circle.

In popular culture
Dada Bhagwan was portrayed by Gulshan Grover in a 2012 independent film Desperate Endeavors directed by French-Algerian director Salim Khassa.

Bibliography
Dada Bhagwan has authored the following books now translated in English:
 Who Am I ?; 
 Generation Gap; 
 Harmony In Marriage; 
 Life Without Conflict; 
 Anger; 
 Worries; 
 The Science Of Karma; 
 Life Without Conflict;

Further reading

References 

Indian spiritual teachers
20th-century mystics
1908 births
1988 deaths
Gujarati people
Syncretists
People from Vadodara district
Hindu reformers
Jain reformers
Gujarati-language writers